Martin Valjent (born 11 December 1995) is a Slovak professional footballer who plays as a centre-back for La Liga club RCD Mallorca.

Career

Ternana Calcio
He made his professional debut for Ternana against Varese on 28 September 2013.

Chievo Verona
In 2017, the defender signed for Chievo Verona just to be sent on loan to his former club for the 2017/18 season.

Mallorca
In August 2018, Valjent moved on loan to Mallorca to reinforce the Balearic defense during the 2018–19 Segunda División campaign. On 26 June 2019, following Mallorca’s promotion to La Liga, the club exercised the option to buy the Slovak for €1.5 million.

International career
Valjent was first called up to the Slovakia national team by Ján Kozák sr. for a double fixture against Netherlands and Morocco on 31 May and 4 June respectively. He was additionally nominated as a result of Gyömbér's (rescheduled club fixture) and Štetina's (injury) unavailability. Although Valjent was benched in the home fixture against Netherlands (1–1), he replaced Tomáš Hubočan in the 79th minute of the fixture against Morocco in Geneva, to mark his debut in Slovakia's senior national team. He was fielded when the score was 1–2 and Slovakia failed to equalize the game.

His first competitive start came in a Euro 2020 qualifying fixture against Croatia on 6 September 2019 in Trnava, with Valjent playing as a right-back. Slovakia lost the game 4–0. It was noted, that Valjent had a difficult task in defending Dejan Lovren at the side-line, as his preferred post is the one of a centre-back. In October, Valjent returned to the national team in a friendly against Paraguay on his preferred post. This time his performance was reported on very positively, receiving praise from RTVS' commentary expert Marián Zeman during the farewell game for Martin Škrtel, with whom he starred in the starting XI, as well as Hubočan and Adam Nemec. This game also coincided with a return to Tehelné pole after some ten years and concluded with a 1–1 tie.

On 26 August 2020, the Mallorca defender was called up by the Slovakia national team to take part in the two opening matches of the UEFA Nations League against Czech Republic and Israel.

Career statistics

Club

International

References

External links
 Profile at the RCD Mallorca website
 Eurofotbal profile 
 Futbalnet profile 
 

1995 births
Living people
People from Dubnica nad Váhom
Sportspeople from the Trenčín Region
Slovak footballers
Association football defenders
2. Liga (Slovakia) players
FK Dubnica players
Serie B players
Ternana Calcio players
A.C. ChievoVerona players
La Liga players
Segunda División players
RCD Mallorca players
Slovak expatriate footballers
Slovak expatriate sportspeople in Spain
Slovak expatriate sportspeople in Italy
Expatriate footballers in Italy
Expatriate footballers in Spain
Slovakia youth international footballers
Slovakia under-21 international footballers
Slovakia international footballers
UEFA Euro 2020 players